On Stage in Stuttgart is a live album by the English Punk rock band Toy Dolls, recorded during their two concerts in 1999 in Stuttgart and Frankfurt, Germany.

Track listing
All compositions by Michael Algar except where noted

 Dig That Groove Theme Tune 2:19
 The Lambrusco Kid 2:54
 Idle Gossip 2:12
 Back In '79 2:48
 She's A Leech 2:25
 I've Got Astma 2:22
 Sabre Dance (Khachaturian) 2:45
 She'll Be Back With Keith Someday 3:43
 Fisticuffs In Frederick Street 4:02
 Bless You My Son 2:00
 My Girlfriends Dads A Vicar 1:08
 Yul Brynner Was A Skinhead 2:56
 Wakey Wakey Theme Tune 0:22
 Stay Mellow 2:04
 Eine Kleine Nacht Musik (Mozart) 4:21
 Fiery Jack 2:42
 Alecs Gone 3:21
 I'm Gonna Be 500 Miles 2:45
 She Goes To Finos 2:57
 Dig That Groove Baby 4:17
 Raiders Of The Lost Ark (Williams) 1:07
 Cloughy Is A Bootboy 2:40
 Glenda And The Test Tube Baby 4:57
 Dougy Giro 3:16
 Nellie The Elephant (Butler, Hart) 6:01

Personnel
 Michael "Olga" Algar - Vocals, Guitar
 Gary "Gary Fun" Dunn - Bass, Vocals
 Martin "Marty" Yule - Drums, Vocals

References

External links
 Album page on The Toy Dolls website
 Album lyrics on http://liva.hr

Toy Dolls albums
1997 live albums